Voimasta ja kunniasta ("Of Strength and Honor") is the second full-length album by the Finnish folk metal band Moonsorrow. It was released on 26 November 2001 through Spinefarm Records.

Track listing

Personnel
 Ville Sorvali - bass, lead and backing vocals, choir, handclaps
 Henri Sorvali - guitars, lead and backing vocals, keyboards, accordion, harmonica, handclaps
 Marko Tarvonen - drums, backing vocals, choir, timpani, 12-string guitar, handclaps
 Mitja Harvilahti - guitars, choir, handclaps

Guest musicians
 Janne Perttilä - handclaps, choir
 Blastmor - handclaps
 Avather - handclaps

Production
 Toni Härkönen - photography
 Skrymer - cover art
 Mika Jussila - mastering
 Ahti Kortelainen - producer, recording, mixing
 Pasi Koivistoinen - layout

References

Moonsorrow albums
2001 albums